Jerzy Ulczyński (born 27 July 1951) is a Polish rower. He competed at the 1972 Summer Olympics and the 1976 Summer Olympics.

References

1951 births
Living people
Polish male rowers
Olympic rowers of Poland
Rowers at the 1972 Summer Olympics
Rowers at the 1976 Summer Olympics
Sportspeople from Opole